The 1954–55 NBA season was the Royals seventh season in the NBA.

Regular season

Season standings

x – clinched playoff spot

Record vs. opponents

Game log

Playoffs

|- align="center" bgcolor="#ffcccc"
| 1
| March 16
| @ Rochester
| L 78–82
| Bobby Wanzer (30)
| St. Paul Auditorium4,841
| 0–1
|- align="center" bgcolor="#ccffcc"
| 2
| March 18
| Rochester
| W 94–92
| Arnie Risen (19)
| Edgerton Park Arena
| 1–1
|- align="center" bgcolor="#ffcccc"
| 3
| March 19
| @ Rochester
| L 110–119
| Arnie Risen (24)
| St. Paul Auditorium4,219
| 1–2
|-

Player statistics

Season

Playoffs

References

Sacramento Kings seasons
Rochester
Rochester Royals
Rochester Royals